Joseph Andre Garcia is a Filipino  actor. At his young age, he already started his career in showbiz. He first appeared on television when he was 5 years old. During summer vacation, he started as a product endorser and commercial model and made several commercials. His most recent projects were in ABS-CBN's Kung Fu Kids and Dyosa.

During the typing of Kung Fu Kids (KFK), it usually takes him about 34 takes to perfect one action sequence. But Enrico Santos, KFK Business Unit head quickly clarifies that "It is not a question of Chubbs' ability as a kid actor, because he is very good, convincing." "The show just requires much more from everyone -- the production to the creative teams to the cast. "

Appearances
At the early age of five, Andre Garcia started his career on the television . He became a commercial model and product endorser. He  also appeared on the television as TV guest in ABS-CBN programs, like in the Boy & Kris, ASAP '08, Wowowee, Wonder Mom, Entertainment Live, etc. Also, he made several mallshows around Metro Manila and provinces together with the other cast of Kung Fu Kids.

Kung Fu Kids (2008)
Kung Fu Kids is the first live anime fantaserye series of Andre Garcia. He played the role of Chester “Chubbs” Trinidad also known as Kid Chubby. He is the lovable son of Mr. Thomas Trinidad (Christopher Roxas) and Mrs. Lydia Trinidad (Arlene Muhlach). Also, he is the best friend of Waldo "Lembot/ Lem" Ramos Jr (Jairus Aquino). 
In this series, he has the ability to make any force applied to his tummy bounce back to repel enemies and has his fighting style of a turtle. Among the eight Kung Fu Kids, he is the only one that don't have a weapon. His attack chant is "Super Chao Bite and Supreme Siopao Attack".

A Very Special Love (2008)

After the Kung Fu Kids, Andre Garcia got his first movie entitled A Very Special Love starring John Lloyd Cruz and Sarah Geronimo. In this movie, he played the role of the younger brother of Sarah Geronimo.

Dyosa

Andre Garcia got his second time on ABS-CBN fantaserye television series which Dyosa starring Anne Curtis, Sam Milby, Luis Manzano and Zanjoe Marudo. In this drama series, he is playing the role of Venus son of Huling (Rubi Rubi) and Miong (Jojit Lorenzo) and a younger brother of Josephine (Ann Curtis). His name in this fantaserye is feminine because according to the story, his mother, Huling, thought that she will give birth to a female child so they gave him the name of Venus.

Filmography

Television

External links
 Telebisyon.net
 Sun Star Bacolod

1999 births
Living people
Star Magic
21st-century Filipino male actors
People from Davao City
Male actors from Davao del Sur